The Macedonian Hussar Regiment was a military unit involved in the Russian Imperial Army. The establishment of the Macedonian Hussar Regiment occurred on 10 May 1759. The Hussars were active in defense of Russia's southern borders, which had become volatile due to new migration and the aftereffects of the War of the Austrian Succession. Over the following decades, the regiment was disbanded and reformed frequently, before disbanding permanently in 1783.

History 
In the middle of the 18th century started a migration from the Military Frontier of the Habsburg monarchy to the Russian Empire. Russian authorities gave these new settlers a land, which acquired names as New Serbia and Slavo-Serbia, soon after the War of the Austrian Succession. The purpose of these polities was protection of southern borders of the Russian empire as well as participation in Russian military operations near that region. Commandant of New Serbia was Jovan Horvat. On March 9, 1759, Horvat, with the permission of Empress Elizaveta Petrovna, formed the Macedonian Hussar Regiment. New Serbia and Slavo-Serbia in fact were populated by a different nationalities and the names of the regiments formed there did not reflect exactly their national composition. Many of the refugees who formed the Macedonian Regiment were described by the imperial authorities as Bulgarians, Vlachs, Serbs and Greeks among the participants. Some were counted as Macedonians, but also a large number of Montenegrins were presented there. The commander of the Macedonian Hussar Regiment was Aleksey Kostyurin.

The coat of arms of the Macedonian Hussar Regiment was approved in 1776 and represented: "A silver shield in a red field, with different decorations, and under it two crossed wooden arrows covered with gold dots." On July 26, 1761, the Macedonian Hussars were merged with the existing Bulgarian Hussar Regiment into a general Macedonian Hussars Regiment because of the small number of personnel in both the regiments. On May 10, 1763, by decree of Empress Catherine II, the Macedonian Hussar Regiment was disbanded and its personnel were assigned to the Polish, Moldovan and Serbian Hussar Regiments. On December 24, 1776, a new Macedonian Hussar Regiment consisting of 6 squadrons was created from the 9 foreign regiments established on the territory of Azov and Novorossiysk regions to protect the southern borders of the empire. On June 28, 1783, it was disbanded and his staff assigned to the Alexandrian Hussar Regiment.

Modern references 
Despite its name, the Macedonian Hussar Regiment was not composed of ethnic Macedonians. The designation Macedonian then was popular in Europe only in early modern cultural contexts, but was nearly forgotten in the modern-day region. Austrian and Russian Empires used it during the 17th and 18th centuries about  populations coming from the Balkans and this is the case of the name of that regiment. Some modern Macedonian historians consider its existence as a confirmation of an ethnic Macedonian continuity, but such claims contradict the historical logic. However along with pointing the example of some participants' belonging to the Macedonian nation, the historian Aleksandar Matkovski has confirmed, that it was too early for existence of such entity in the modern sense. On the other hand Blaže Ristovski has agreed, that the theories of Macedonian identity evolved outside the modern region and existed without the participation of Macedonian Slavs at least until the second half of the 19th century. According to some reports, the regiment was dominated by Aromanians (Vlachs), who were then often treated as Macedonians, which is the reason for the regiment's name.  However per two guides issued by the Russian Academy of Sciences, the first in 1861, and another one from 1910, during the 18th century as Macedonians were designated part of the Bulgarian refugees. According to some researchers, the idea of creating these regiments was not a project to build national units, while it preceded the birth of nationalism in Europe.

See also 
 Karposh's rebellion
 Macedonian nationalism

References

Hussars
Cavalry regiments of the Russian Empire
1759
Seven Years' War